Fenyuan Township is a rural township in Changhua County, Taiwan.

Geography
Fenyuan encompasses  and a population of 22,417, including 11,777 males and 10,640 females as of January 2023.

Administrative divisions
The township comprises 15 villages: Dapu, Dazhu, Fengkeng, Fenyuan, Jiapei, Jiaxing, Jinfen, Jiushe, Shekou, Tongan, Xianzhuang, Xitou, Zhonglun, Zhulin and Zunqi.

Tourist attractions
 Alice's Garden
 Baozang Temple

Notable natives
 Lin Shu-fen, member of 7th, 8th and 9th Legislative Yuan

References

External links
 Fenyuan Government website

Townships in Changhua County